Patriarch George V may refer to:

 Patriarch Ignatius George V, Syriac Orthodox Patriarch of Antioch (ruled in 1819–1837)
 Patriarch Ignatius George V Shelhot, Syriac Catholic Patriarch of Antioch (1874–1891)